Robert Agrippa Moengaroa Whaitiri (9 May 1916 – 11 July 1996) was a notable New Zealand  guide, soldier, launch and tug master, factory manager, community leader. Of Māori descent, he identified with the Ngāi Tahu, Ngāti Mamoe and Waitaha iwi. He was born in Bluff, Southland, New Zealand in 1916.

References

1916 births
1996 deaths
Ngāi Tahu people
People from Bluff, New Zealand
New Zealand Māori soldiers
Kāti Māmoe people
Waitaha (South Island iwi)
New Zealand sailors